Tanks have been utilized in Iran both within the military and within several conflicts with their usage and origin after World War II; the Cold War; and the modern era. This includes British designs imported after World War II, and American and imported Soviet tanks and those from China as well.

Overview
Iran originally had ordered tanks from Czechoslovakia before the war began but then it got tanks from Great Britain after World War II when it oversaw Iran. From these beginnings the modern Iranian Armoured forces grew and procured modern armoured fighting vehicles from the United States and the United Kingdom that served during the Cold War, and various operations. One of the main Iranian operations using armor such as the U.S. M60 and British Chieftain, was during the Iran–Iraq War, and now is importing Russian models and making its own designs.

History

Several tanks were used in Iran in the 1930s (such as 100 of the FT tank) as it ordered and had delivered in 1937-38 tanks such as the CKD AH-IV tankette used by the 1st infantry division and the CKD-TNH 60/Panzer 38(t) of the 2nd infantry division in 1941 and the Imperial Guards. Iran was the first customer for the AH-IV and ordered fifty plus a prototype in 1935 for delivery the following year. Deliveries began in August 1936 with the last batch arriving in Iran in May 1937, although the armament was shipped separately and wasn't installed until November 1937. The Iranians planned to order between 100 and 300 additional AH-IVs, but the outbreak of World War II prevented any follow-through.

These tanks faced the more than 1000 Soviet tanks in the Anglo-Soviet invasion in August 1941. The Soviet Union invaded from the north with the armored forces occupying Iran's northern provinces and the British coming from the South. The Soviets used about 1,000 T-26 tanks for their combat operations against the Iranian forces.

In the Allied occupation of southern Iran, the British used the  4th British Cavalry Brigade (later renamed 9th Armoured Brigade). The United Kingdom’s assembled the Iraq Command which was renamed "Persia and Iraq Force" or Paiforce. Paiforce composed of the 8th and 10th Indian Infantry Divisions and an independent brigade each of armor, cavalry and infantry. The invading Allies had over 200,000 troops and modern  tanks, and artillery. The British tanks consisted mostly of the Mark IVb light tanks armed with .50 caliber Vickers machine gun.

In response to the invasion, the Iranian Army mobilised two armoured divisions with their tanks and nine infantry divisions, some of them motorised. The Iranian army had a standing force of 126,000–200,000 men. While Iran had taken numerous steps through the previous decade to strengthen, standardise and create a modern army, they did not have enough armour and air power to fight a multi-front war. Reza Shah's modernisations had not been completed by the time war broke out and the Iranian Army had been more concerned with civilian repression than invasions.

The Iranian army was armed with several models of tanks for its armoured forces, as Iran had bought 100 FT-6 in addition to the Panzer 38(t) light tanks and additional LaFrance TK-6 armoured cars, enough to fully outfit their 1st and 2nd divisions. While it was a large order and they were excellent tanks, they were not enough to defeat a multi-front invasion by two great powers. The changing nature of tank warfare in the 1930s made all but 50 of them obsolete when the invasion began.

The Iranians had little time to organise a defence, as the Allies achieved a tactical surprise. The Allies quickly moved their tanks and infantry against the Iranian forces as Reza Shah refused requests by his generals to destroy the road and transportation networks, largely because he did not want to damage the infrastructure that he had painstakingly built during his reign. That contributed to the speedy victory of the Allies. With no allies, Iranian resistance was rapidly overwhelmed and neutralised by Soviet and British tanks and infantry.

After the war, the Russians refused to leave at first and actually sent Soviet reinforcements of at least 200 tanks in 15 brigades to Tabrīz and deployed south toward Qazvīn, and at the Turkish border and the Iraqi border. The Russians finally left after pressure from Britain and the US and not long afterwards, Iran received WWII tanks from the British to rebuild its armoured forces during the 1950s. Then it sought more modern tanks in the 1960s and got MBTs such as the Chieftain in large numbers. The largest foreign sale of the Chieftain tanks was in fact to Iran, which took delivery of 707 Mk-3P and Mk-5P (the letter P standing for Persia), as well as 187 FV4030-1, 41 ARV and 14 AVLB before the 1979 revolution. Iran also turned to America for tanks such as the M47/M48 and M60A1, spending over 8 billion during the 1970s. But after the Shah was overthrown in 1979, Iran turned to other sources and imported from Russia and China such as the T-72S, T-62s, and T-54/T-55/Type 59s but these were in limited numbers and Iran made some tanks domestically.

After the Islamic Revolution in 1979, the regular army and air force had suffered due to purges and lack of supplies and spare parts from their former Western allies, especially the US and UK, left it vulnerable. On September 22, 1980, Iraqi military forces under the command of Saddam Hussein invaded Iran. Iran received 300 Type 59 tanks from North Korea and China during the Iran–Iraq War. They were fielded by both the regular Artesh and the Islamic Revolutionary Guard Corps. The Iraqi T-72s proved highly superior to the Chinese tank.

The Chieftain tank and along with the M60 tank was used extensively by Iran during the Iran–Iraq War of 1980–88, including the largest tank battle of the war, with mixed results as the Chieftain Mk 3/5 suffered from chronic engine problems and low power-to-weight ratio, making the Chieftain unreliable and slow when maneuvering over harsh terrain, which in turn made it prone to breakdowns in the midst of battle or a sluggish target and thus vulnerable to enemy tank fire. Out of the 875 Chieftain tanks that had started the war only 200 were left. The Iranians captured many Iraqi tanks and Operation Ramadan was launched at Baghdad with over 100,000 Revolutionary Guards backed by M60 and Chieftain tanks, including many captured T-55s, but the Iraqi tanks and infantry repelled it. By end of the war, the Iranian tried one last attack, in Operation Karbala, with a large force of their tanks with the Revolutionary Guard's 31st Ashura and the Army's 77th Khorasan armored divisions, which depleted the tank forces as well as the infantry.

While the Iranian Army used mainly the British Chieftain and American M60 during the Iran–Iraq War, it moved to acquire newer main battle tanks to modernize its forces. It received 104 T-72M1 battle tanks from former Soviet Bloc nations and received a licence from Russia to produce T-72S battle tanks domestically. With this they made over 2500 T-72S battle tanks which it put into its armoured divisions. 
 

Iran announced on 12 March 2017 it has an indigenous main battle tank, the Karrar (striker), which is an upgraded version of the  Iranian T-72S tank, where it was stated that it possessed an electro-optical fire control system, a laser rangefinder, ballistic computer and could fire at both stationary and mobile targets in day or night.
It also has the Zulfiqar (tank) named after the twin-pointed legendary sword of Ali, and was developed from major components of the American M-60 tank.  The IISS estimates that around 150 Zulfiqar 1's are now in service.

Overview of Tanks

Light and medium tanks

Main battle tanks

Self-propelled artillery

See also

 History of the tank
 Tanks in World War II
 Tank classification
 List of military vehicles

References

Further reading 
 Jane's Intelligence Review, June 1993

 
Military history of Iran
Weapon development
History of the tank